Alguien (English: Someone) is a Latin pop song written and performed by Kany García. The song was chosen as the second single from Kany's third album, Kany García. The song was released to iTunes on July 10, 2012 as a promo and was released to radios in August.

Composition and inspiration
La canción "Alguien" se inspiró en una relación que tuvo el hermano de Kany. Ella afirma: "Cuando alguien falla, creemos que nadie sufre como nosotros, que nadie ama más que nosotros"."

Chart performance
"Alguien" debuted at #39 on Billboard Latin Pop Songs and #42 on Latin Songs on week ending September 14, 2012. So far, the song has peaked top 10 on Latin Pop Songs becoming Kany Garcia's 4th top 10 on that chart as well as first top 10 since 2009.

Charts

Other Versions

A duet version was recorded with Bachata artist Alexandra. It was released for digital download on December 10, 2012.

Track listing
"Alguien" (Album Version) - 3:04
"Alguien" (Radio Version) - 3:00
"Alguien" (Bachata/Duet Version) - 3:11

References

2012 singles
Bachata songs
Songs written by Kany García
2012 songs
Sony BMG singles
Song recordings produced by Julio Reyes Copello